Alive from Off Center, renamed Alive TV in 1992, was an American arts anthology television series aired by PBS between 1985 and 1996.

Each week, the series featured experimental short films by a mixture of up-and-coming and established directors. Notable episodes included "As Seen on TV," starring comic actor Bill Irwin as an auditioning dancer who becomes trapped in a television, wandering among daytime dramas, MTV, and PBS's own Sesame Street and the atmospheric puppet melodrama "Street of Crocodiles," adapted by the Brothers Quay from the Bruno Schulz  story.

Other installments included "Dances in Exile" directed by Howard Silver, a recorded dance piece with text by David Henry Hwang and choreography by Ruby Shang and another directed by Jonathan Demme.

Arguably the series' best-known episode was What You Mean We? a short film written by, directed by, and starring Laurie Anderson, which aired in 1986. Anderson later came back to host the 1987 season of the series, assisted by the Clone (who was eventually renamed Fenway Bergamot with a slightly different body shape), a masculine version of Anderson created by digitally altering her image and obscuring her voice that had been introduced in What You Mean We? Most episodes of the 1987 season opened with a brief skit by Anderson and the clone by way of introducing that week's piece.

Actress Ann Magnuson subsequently co-hosted the 1988 season, after which the series had no regular hosts.

References

External links
 
 Alive from Off Center at GBH OpenVault
 =all Alive from Off Center] at the American Archive of Public Broadcasting
 =allAlive TV] at the American Archive of Public Broadcasting

PBS original programming
1985 American television series debuts
1996 American television series endings
Performance art